Shona Margaret Bell (married name Grant-Taylor, 1924 – 7 December 2011) was a New Zealand palaeontologist.

She studied the fossils of the Corbies Creek area of North Otago and the Benmore Dam area. The 1954 Directory of New Zealand Science records her as an assistant palaeontologist at the Geological Survey of New Zealand. She was employed by GSNZ from 1948 to 1950, but resigned on her marriage to Tom Grant-Taylor, as was expected at the time.

In 2011 a newly discovered genus of fossil in the Codiaceae family was named Shonabellia in her honour by Gregory Retallack. The type species Shonabellia verrucosa was found near Benmore Dam, an area where Bell was the first to describe fossil plants.

References

1924 births
2011 deaths
New Zealand paleontologists
20th-century New Zealand women scientists
New Zealand women botanists
20th-century New Zealand botanists